Kanakambarangal is a 1988 Indian Malayalam film, directed by N. Sankaran Nair and produced by A. P. Lal. The film stars Thilakan, Murali, Babu Namboothiri and Balan K. Nair in the lead roles. The film has musical score by K. Raghavan.

Cast
Thilakan as SI Thomas George
Murali as Ananthan Balussery
Babu Namboothiri as Thirumeni
Balan K. Nair
Kunjandi as Gopalan Master
Kuthiravattam Pappu as Nanappan
Monisha as Sreedevi 
Vineeth as Rajan
Santha Devi as Sreedevi's mother
Nilambur Balan as Police Inspector

Soundtrack
The music was composed by K. Raghavan and the lyrics were written by P. Bhaskaran.

References

External links
 

1988 films
1980s Malayalam-language films
Films directed by N. Sankaran Nair